Girindra Nath Gogoi was a former Member of Assam Legislative Assembly and Minister of State for PWD. He was the father of former Speaker and Minister Pranab Kumar Gogoi.

Political career 
In the 1952 Assam Legislative Assembly election, Gogoi was the Indian National Congress candidate for the constituency of Sibsagar. He received 11613 votes and became the MLA of the constituency. He was made a deputy minister in Bishnu Ram Medhi’s cabinet.

In the 1957 Assam Legislative Assembly election, Gogoi was again the Indian National Congress candidate for Sibsagar. He received 11638 votes and was reelected.

In the 1962 Assam Legislative Assembly election, he received 12282 votes and was reelected. He became a Minister of State for the PWD.

In the 1967 Assam Legislative Assembly Election, Gogoi received 9735 votes, losing to Communist Party candidate Promode Gogoi.

Personal life 
Gogoi was married to the late Hiranyalata Gogoi. They had a son, Pranab Kumar Gogoi (19 August 1936 – 3 February 2020) who also became MLA for Sibsagar and became a minister and Speaker. 

Their daughter Pratima Gohain married an engineer, Ghana Kanta Gohain.

Their youngest son Prabin Kumar Gogoi was an eminent scholar, and an educationist. He held various important functions in the Education department in the Government of Assam.

References 

Assam MLAs 1952–1957
Assam MLAs 1957–1962
Assam MLAs 1962–1967
Year of death missing
Year of birth missing
Place of birth missing
Place of death missing
Indian National Congress politicians from Assam